Lorenzo Senni (born 1983) is an Italian musician and visual artist. His first release on Warp Records was in 2016. His most recent full-length album Scacco Matto was released on April 24, 2020.

He is also the founder of Presto!? Records.

Discography

Studio albums
Quantum Jelly (Mego, 2012)
Superimpositions (Boomkat, 2014)
Scacco Matto (Warp, 2020)

EPs
Persona (Warp, 2016)
The Challenge (with Francesco Fantini) (Warp, 2018)
The Shape of RemixXxes to Come (remixes) (Warp, 2018)

References

Living people
Warp (record label) artists
1983 births
Italian electronic musicians